Paripiranga is a municipality in the state of Bahia in the Northeast Region of Brazil.

See also
List of municipalities in Bahia

References

Municipalities in Bahia